Ivan Mustapić (born 9 July 1966 in Posušje, SR Bosnia and Herzegovina, SFR Yugoslavia) is a former Croatian javelin thrower. He competed for Croatia at the 1992 Summer Olympics. He was also Croatian national javelin throw champion four times. His personal best throw was 82.70 metres, achieved in 1992. He competed at the World Championships in Athletics on three occasions, having his best finish (20th) in 1993.

International competitions

Seasonal bests by year
1987 - 73.34
1990 - 75.04
1992 - 82.70 
1993 - 79.90
1994 - 81.22
1995 - 79.78

References

1966 births
Living people
People from Posušje
Croatian male javelin throwers
Yugoslav male javelin throwers
Olympic athletes of Croatia
Athletes (track and field) at the 1992 Summer Olympics
World Athletics Championships athletes for Croatia
World Athletics Championships athletes for Yugoslavia
Athletes (track and field) at the 1987 Mediterranean Games
Athletes (track and field) at the 1993 Mediterranean Games
Mediterranean Games silver medalists for Yugoslavia
Mediterranean Games gold medalists for Croatia
Mediterranean Games medalists in athletics